The Mail is a private daily newspaper in Zimbabwe. It is claimed that the newspaper is the only balanced newspaper in Zimbabwe, with its between the line editorial.
The daily newspaper became Zimbabwe's first daily newspaper to be registered after the closure of the Daily News in 2003. The publisher/Managing Director of the Mail Newspaper is Hensley Chamboko, and it is edited by veteran Barnabas Thondhlana. The newspaper also runs an online version www.mailonline.co.zw, and is affiliated to The BusinessWeekly, a private economics weekly title.
Its offices are located at ZB Centre, Harare.

References 

Newspapers published in Zimbabwe